This is a list of the tallest buildings in Iceland.

Tallest buildings

Tallest structures
An incomplete list of the tallest structures in Iceland. This list contains all types of structures.

References

Iceland
Towers in Iceland
Tallest buildings
Iceland